The Priory of the Holy Saviour on Mount Thabor, or more simply Mount Thabor Convent was a house of Augustinian canonesses founded near the city of Mechelen in the second half of the 15th century. The convent was burnt down in 1572, during the Spanish Fury at Mechelen, and the community was temporarily disbanded in 1578 but was refounded within the city walls of Mechelen in 1585. The convent was suppressed in 1783, under Emperor Joseph II, and from 1844 a school operated on the site. Since 1851 it has housed the Scheppersinstituut Mechelen.

References

Further reading
E. Persoons, "Onkosten voor de stichting van het Mechelse Thaborklooster", Archief- en Bibliotheekwezen in België 42 (1971).

15th-century establishments in the Holy Roman Empire
1783 disestablishments in the Habsburg monarchy
1783 disestablishments in the Holy Roman Empire
Disestablishments in the Austrian Netherlands
Augustinian monasteries in Belgium
Christian monasteries established in the 15th century
Mechelen